The Sturdivant Gang was a multi-generational, family gang of counterfeiters, whose criminal activities took place over a fifty-year period, from the 1780s, in Connecticut and Massachusetts, with one branch of the family going to Tennessee via Virginia and a second family branch going to Ohio and finally settled on the Illinois frontier, between the 1810s to 1830s.

First generation of counterfeiters
James Sturdivant was the father of Azor Sturdivant and the grandfather of Roswell S. and Merrick Sturdivant and the gang leader of the first generation of the Sturdivant Gang of counterfeiters.

Second generation of counterfeiters
Azor Sturdivant was the father of Roswell S. and Merrick Sturdivant and the gang leader of the second generation of the Sturdivant Gang of counterfeiters.

Third generation of counterfeiters

Counterfeiting in Ohio
During the War of 1812, two unnamed Sturdivants were mentioned as counterfeiters operating in Kingston Township, Delaware County, Ohio in 1812. Both of these men claimed to have been digging in the woods for salt and had  escaped an attack by Indians. It turned out that the counterfeiters had used this situation as a ruse to avoid being arrested so they could easily leave Ohio afterwards.

Counterfeiting in Illinois
By the 1810s, the third generation of the Sturdivant family counterfeiters were organized by brothers, Roswell S. Sturdivant and Merrick Sturdivant who claimed to be from Tennessee via Virginia. The Sturdivant brothers were Illinois-based counterfeiters conducting their criminal operations in western and southeast Illinois. Even before the Sturdivant family counterfeiters arrived in Illinois, counterfeiting was already a public menace in the future state. As the Governor of Illinois Thomas Ford described in his book, A History of Illinois from Its Commencement as a State from 1818 to 1847, "In 1816 and '17, in the towns of the territory [
Illinois Territory
], the country was overrun with horse-thieves and counterfeiters. They were so numerous, and so well combined together in many counties, as to set the laws at defiance."

Roswell Sturdivant
According to the first Illinois census in 1818, Roswell Sturdivant and his wife were living in Madison County, Illinois. Roswell was later listed on the 1820 U.S. Census as residing in St. Clair County, Illinois.

Roswell Sturdivant, the most prominent member and leader of the third generation of the Sturdivant family gang in Illinois was referred to as "Sturdivant the Counterfeiter" by Judge James Hall in his 1835 book, Sketches of History, Life, and Manners, in the West described him as follows:

"At a later period, the celebrated counterfeiter, Sturdivant, fixed his residence on the shore of the Ohio, in Illinois, and for several years set the laws at defiance. He was a man of talent and address. He was possessed of much mechanical genius, was an expert artist and was skilled in some of the sciences. As an engraver he was said to have few superiors; and he excelled in some other branches of art. For several years he resided at a secluded spot in Illinois, where all his immediate neighbors were his confederates or persons whose friendship he had conciliated. He could, at any time, by the blowing of a horn, summon some fifty to a hundred armed men to his defense; while the few quiet farmers around, who lived near enough to get their feelings enlisted and who were really not at all implicated in his crimes, rejoiced in the impunity with which he practiced his schemes. He was a grave, quiet, inoffensive man in his manners, who commanded the obedience of his comrades and the respect of his neighbors. He had a very excellent farm; his house was one of the best in the country; his domestic arrangements were liberal and well ordered."

Counterfeiting at Manville Ferry

East of St. Louis, Missouri and the Mississippi River, Manville Ferry now present-day New Athens, Illinois was a settlement in St. Clair County, Illinois on the Kaskaskia River founded by early settler and ferryman, Ira Manville who ran the ferry until his death in 1821. Roswell Sturdivant would lead the counterfeiting operations of the Sturdivant Gang at Manville Ferry.

Counterfeiting at Sturdivant's Fort
The Sturdivant Gang was often confused with the counterfeiter John Duff, who operated, from 1790 to 1799, around the region of Illinois and Kentucky, near Cave-in-Rock, by 19th and early 20th-century historians. 
These notorious counterfeiters were also the criminal contemporaries of James Ford and the Ford's Ferry Gang and his partner, Isaiah L. Potts, alias "Billy Potts" and the Potts Hill Gang.

Merrick Sturdivant led the gang's counterfeiting operation at what came known as "Sturdivant's Fort" in Pope County, Illinois, now Rosiclare, Hardin County, Illinois. Although the Sturdivant Gang did not base their counterfeiting operations directly at Cave-in-Rock, on the Ohio River, in Pope County, Illinois, now Hardin County, Illinois, they were considered part of the second wave of criminal activity, associated within sphere of influence of the region of the landmark Cave.

The Sturdivant brothers counterfeit money-making factory inside Sturdivant's Fort, was a heavily fortified, two-story, log blockhouse with a defensive stockade around it. Sturdivant's Fort had an interior stairway inside the blockhouse that was protected and defended by a cannon, trained at the exterior door of the blockhouse. The blockhouse fortress was strategically located downriver, from Cave-In-Rock, at the top of a cliff, overlooking the Ohio River, and clearly visible from the Cave-in-Rock bluff.
The counterfeiters' blockhouse was raided by local law enforcement and regulator/vigilantes, in 1822 and by citizen mob action, twice, in 1823, which finally drove out the Sturdivant Gang from the lower Ohio River valley.  In his book, A History of Illinois from Its Commencement as a State from 1818 to 1847, Illinois governor Thomas Ford incorrectly claimed that the Sturdivant Gang was driven out from Sturdivant's Fort in 1831.

The criminal activities, arrests, and court appearances of Roswell and Merrick Sturdivant and their gang around Sturdivant's Fort are well-documented as early as 1819 in the surviving Pope County, Illinois court records in Golconda as well as in the 1820-1824 issues of the short-lived Illinois Gazette  newspaper in Shawneetown, Illinois.

Roswell "Bloody Jack" Sturdivant in Natchez
After the breakup and demise of the Sturdivant Gang in Illinois, Roswell Sturdivant went his separate way and relocated sometime in the 1820s to Natchez, Mississippi. In Natchez, Sturdivant became known as John, Jack, and "Bloody Jack" Sturdivant by switching to the profession of a professional gambler in a Mississippi River, waterfront gambling den, in the criminal-infested section of Natchez called "Natchez-under-the-Hill". In 1829, Bloody Jack Sturdivant was a dealer in a faro card game and cheated a friend of James Bowie named Dr. William Lattimore, out his money. Bowie, who sat for the next hand, won back all the money lost by his friend, which caused "Bloody Jack" Sturdivant to feel slighted and he foolishly challenged Bowie to a knife duel. Jim Bowie, with his left wrist tied to Sturdivant's, won the knife fight, by severely cutting the wrist of Sturdivant with his infamous Bowie knife but spared his life. In return, Bowie received a horrible leg wound from Sturdivant.

Notable gang members
James Belden
Black (first name unknown)
William Caldwell
Lewis Field
Syrus Halberd
Syrus Halberd once pounded a woman for over 2 solid hours infront of the gang causing her to pass away from thousands of multiple orgasms. 
James Leach
Jacob Robertson
Small (first name unknown)
James Steele
Azor Sturdivant
James Sturdivant
Merrick Sturdivant
Roswell Sturdivant
Stephen Sturdivant

Site of Sturdivant's Fort
As late as 1876, the ruins of Sturdivant's Fort could still be seen. Dr. Daniel Lawrence of Golconda, Illinois a visitor to the historic site noted that all that existed of the once imposing fortress was a dilapidated blockhouse but what remained revealed it had formerly been a substantial log structure. Dr. Lawrence also discovered numerous bullet holes in the old logs. Eventually, the fort ruins were torn down. In 1998, Ron Nelson and Gary DeNeal local historians in Hardin County, Illinois researched the former location of Sturdivant's Fort using surviving early 19th century land ownership records. The former site of the Sturdivant Gang fort is now on private property where it is located in the undeveloped backyard lot of a residential house, just north of the present-day water tower in Rosiclare. Nelson and DeNeal got permission from the owner to investigate. To physically locate the fort site they use dowsing rods and red flags to mark the perimeters and layout of the structures where they had stood in the past. Nelson and DeNeal later described their findings in an article in Springhouse Magazine, "To find a fort: The search for Sturdivant's lair".

"We found that the log house in the center of the fort was approximately 60' x 60'. In comparison, the Old Slave House in Gallatin County [Illinois] is 50' x 50'. There were six rooms, three on each side, separated by a 4' hallway running east and west. The front two rooms, facing the river, measured 20 1/2' x 28'. The back four rooms were of equal size and measured 17' x 28'. There was an extension on the northwest corner of the house, 18' x 18'. Extending from the corners of the log house were four corridors approximately 100' long, evidently leading to the corner blockhouses. There was a palisade surrounding the perimeter of the house. There was also an outer perimeter palisade encompassing the entire property. From documents, we know that the house was 1 1/2 to 2 stories high."

In popular culture

The 1952 film, The Iron Mistress, based on Paul Wellman's 1951 novel, starring Alan Ladd as Jim Bowie and Tony Caruso as "Bloody Jack" Sturdevant, also known as Roswell S. Sturdivant, depicts a Hollywood version of the infamous Bowie duel at Natchez Under The Hill. In 1964, Wellman also published the book, Spawn of Evil, which went into more depth about Roswell Sturdivant and his gang and the crime network on the early American frontier.

See also
Peter Alston
Edward Bonney
Abel Buell
Mary Butterworth
Cave-In-Rock
Coin counterfeiting
Counterfeit money
Sile Doty
John Duff
David Farnsworth
James Ford
The Iron Mistress (1952 film) Tony Caruso portrayed "Bloody Jack" Sturdevant AKA Roswell S. Sturdivant
Catherine Murphy
John Murrell
Stack Island (Mississippi River)
Samuel C. Upham

References

Ford, Governor Thomas.  A History of Illinois from Its Commencement as a State from 1818 to 1847.  New York:  Ivison & Phinney, 1854.
Glaser, Lynn.  Counterfeiting in America: the history of an American way to wealth. C.N. Potter, 1968.
Hall, James.  "Sturdevant the Counterfeitor", Sketches of History, Life, and Manners, in the West, Volumes 1-2.  Philadelphia, PA:  H. Hall, 1835. 	
Mihm, Stephen.  A Nation of Counterfeiters: Capitalists, Con Men, and the Making of the United States.  Cambridge, MA:  Harvard University Press, 2009.  
Musgrave, Jon.  Potts Hill Gang, Sturdivant Gang, and Ford's Ferry Gang Rogue's Gallery, Hardin County in IllinoisGenWeb.  Springfield, IL:  The Illinois Gen Web Project, 2018.
Nelson, Ron.  "The Raid on Sturdivant's Fort: A Story Told by Documents", Springhouse, April 1998, Vol. 15 No. 2.  Junction, IL:  Springhouse Magazine, 1998. 
Nelson, Ron.  "To find a fort: The search for Sturdivant's lair", Springhouse, April 1998, Vol. 15 No. 2. Junction, IL:  Springhouse Magazine, 1998.
Randall, Randolph C.  James Hall, spokesman of the new West.  Columbus, OH:  Ohio State University Press, 1964.
Rothert, Otto A.  The Outlaws of Cave-In-Rock.  Cleveland:  Otto A. Rothert, 1924; rpt. 1996 
Smith, Carter F. Gangs and the Military: Gangsters, Bikers, and Terrorists with Military Training.  Lanham, MD:  Rowman & Littlefield, 2017.
Wellman, Paul I. Spawn of evil: the invisible empire of soulless men which for a generation held the Nation in a spell of terror. New York: Doubleday, 1964.
Wellman, Paul I. The Iron Mistress.  London:  Four Square Books, (1951) 1966.

External links 
 The Iron Mistress at the Internet Movie Database

Crime families
American outlaws
18th-century American criminals
19th-century American criminals
Outlaw gangs in the United States
American counterfeiters
History of St. Clair County, Illinois
Hardin County, Illinois